Couvains is the name of several communes in France:

Couvains, Manche
Couvains, Orne